NGC 372 is a triple star located in the constellation Pisces. It was discovered on December 12, 1876 by Dreyer, who described it as "stellar, much brighter middle, mottled but not resolved."

References

0372
18761212
Pisces (constellation)